Jason Shinder (1955–2008) was an American poet who authored three books and founded the YMCA National Writer's Voice. His last book, Stupid Hope (Graywolf Press, 2009), was released posthumously.

He was born in Brooklyn New York in 1955, and published his first literary work in 1993, with the release of Every Room We Ever Slept In, which became a New York Public Library Notable Book. He went on to author Among Women and Uncertain Hours, he also edited numerous anthologies, including The Poem That Changed America: "Howl" Fifty Years Later and The Poem I Turn To: Actors and Directors Present Poetry That Inspires Them. In addition to founding and directing the National Writer's Voice, Shinder also served as director of the Sundance Institute Writing Program,  as a teacher in the graduate writing program at Bennington College, as a graduate teacher at New School University, and was a Poet Laureate of Provincetown. Shinder also earned a Literature Fellowship from the National Endowment for the Arts in 2007.

Shinder died in April 2008. He had non-Hodgkin's lymphoma and leukemia. "Cancer is a tremendous opportunity," he said, philosophically, "to have your face pressed right up against the glass of your mortality."  In his brief poem "Company," he writes:

I've been avoiding my illness

because I'm afraid

I will die and when I do,

I'll end up alone again.

Published works
Full-length Poetry Collections
 Stupid Hope (Graywolf Press, 2009)
 Among Women (Graywolf Press, 2001)
 Every Room We Ever Slept In(Sheep Meadow Press, 1993)

Chapbooks
 Uncertain Hours (Arrowsmith Press, 2006)

References

External links
 POEM: The New Yorker > Poetry > Living by Jason Shinder > October 1, 2007
 ARTICLE: The New York Times > Arts > Jason Shinder, 52, Poet and Founder of Arts Program, Dies  > by Margalit Fox > May 3, 2008
 POEM: Academy of American Poets > Jason Shinder > The One Secret That Has Carried
 REVIEW: The Los Angeles Times > Book Review by David L. Ulin of Stupid Hope by Jason Shinder > August 2, 2009
Stuart A. Rose Manuscript, Archives, and Rare Book Library, Emory University: Jason Shinder papers, circa 1970-2008

1955 births
2008 deaths
Writers from New York (state)
People from Brooklyn
Bennington College faculty
The New School faculty
National Endowment for the Arts Fellows
The New Yorker people
20th-century American poets